Incarceration in Florida is one of the main forms of punishment, rehabilitation, or both for the commission of felony and other offenses in the state.

History
Mandatory guidelines such as the 1999 10-20-Life and the 1995 Three-strikes law established minimum sentencing for those convicted of crimes. The 1995 law requiring convicts to serve 85% of their sentence and Zero tolerance have all contributed to lengthening prisoners sentences in Florida.

Cost
In 2013, the average cost to house a prisoner was $18,000 per inmate annually.

Population
In 2013, there were 100,844 inmates, aged 14 to 93. 93% of the population were males, 7% females. Figures do not include those in local jails or juvenile justice systems.

53% have been incarcerated for violent crimes. Drugs offenses constitute 17% of the population.

In 2013, 564 people were in prison for driving with a suspended license, in turn, often the result of failure to pay a fine or a fee.

See also
Crime in Florida
Florida Department of Corrections
Law of Florida

Notes

Penal system in Florida